Dongcheon-dong is both an administrative and legal dong or a neighbourhood of the Gyeongju City, North Gyeongsang province, South Korea. It is bordered by Bodeok-dong on the east, Yonggang-dong and Seongdong-dong on the west, Bohwang-dong on the south and Cheonbuk-myeon on the north. Its 5.26 square kilometers are home to about 26,507 people. After the liberation of Korea, returnees from abroad were numerous; a village for them was constructed in present-day Dongcheon-dong

Dongcheon-dong has one elementary school and Gyeonghui School established for the mentally disabled.

See also
Subdivisions of Gyeongju
Administrative divisions of South Korea

References

External links
 The official site of the Dongcheon-dong office

Subdivisions of Gyeongju
Neighbourhoods in South Korea